Turnout may refer to:
 Turnout (ballet), a rotation of the leg which comes from the hips, causing the knee and foot to turn outward, away from the center of the body
 Turnout (film), a British film
 Voter turnout, the percentage of eligible voters who cast a ballot in an election
 A lay-by, turnout or pullout
 a place to pull off a road for parking
 a rest area
 A passing place, turnout or pullout, a spot on a single track road where vehicles can pull over to let others pass
 Railroad switch (US), turnout or set of points, a mechanical installation enabling trains to be guided from one railway track to another
 Coach (carriage) or carriage together with the horses, harness and attendants
 Bunker gear or turnout gear, the protective gear worn by firefighters